Mossom is a surname. Notable people with the surname include:

 Audrey Mossom (1920–2009), English teen celebrity and dancer
 Eland Mossom ( 1709–1774), Irish lawyer and politician
 Robert Mossom (bishop) (1617–1679), Bishop of Derry
 Robert Mossom (priest), Dean of Ossory in the 18th century